Humpty Dumpty (Humphrey Dumpler) is a fictional character from DC Comics. Unlike many of Batman's enemies, he is not deliberately malevolent, and is typically portrayed as comic relief.

Publication history
Humpty Dumpty first appeared in the 2003 graphic novel Arkham Asylum: Living Hell and was created by Dan Slott and Ryan Sook.

Fictional character biography
Humphry Dumpler is a hulking man with an egg-shaped head who speaks in rhyme and has a compulsive desire to "repair" that which he considers to be broken. He is shown in flashback to have been the victim of inexplicable, almost supernaturally bad luck almost since birth, illustrated by countless tragedies through his life. Eventually, he became determined to understand the mechanics of the world around him in an attempt to see what made things go wrong for him and attempt to fix them. In his crimes, Humpty disassembles and reassembles mechanical devices that upset him in some way. The devices he "fixes" cause numerous accidents, such as a subway train derailing. Humpty Dumpty's final crime is to adjust the gears in a clock tower, causing one of its hands to fly off, provoking a chain reaction in which dozens of enormous signs crashed to the streets, killing dozens of people. When Batgirl tries to apprehend him, she dislocates her arms. Humpty promptly slips her arms back into their sockets and surrenders to her. Revealing that she had tracked him by his overdue library books, her sole question was why he had borrowed a copy of Gray’s Anatomy. Humpty takes her to his home to reveal he had dissected his abusive grandmother and sewn her back together with bootlace in an ill-thought attempt to "fix" her.

He is a model prisoner at Arkham Asylum and is given various small projects to pass the time, such as repairing a broken mirror or fixing Ventriloquist's Scarface dummy. He befriends the financial fraudster Warren White and saves his life from Death Rattle and Two-Face.

In Villains United Humpty Dumpty joins Alexander Luthor Jr.'s Society. He is seen partaking in the attack upon the House of Secrets.

He is one of the villains sent to retrieve the Get Out of Hell free card from the Secret Six.

In the Batman: Battle for the Cowl storyline, Humpty Dumpty is recruited by Black Mask as part of a group of villains aiming to take over Gotham.

During the Batman: Leviathan storyline, Humpty Dumpty masquerades as Santa Claus as part of a plan to get stolen toys to the children at the Rainbow House Shelter. He is approached by a man named Abuse who asks if he knows about any missing children. Worried that he will be found out, Humpty Dumpty knocks Abuse unconscious and flees to the shelter. Once there, Humpty Dumpty begins placing repaired toys in the children's beds until Batman and Robin show up. As Batman questions Humpty, Robin notices that, even with the lights on and all three talking, none of the children have woken up or made a sound. Looking under the covers, Robin discovers that the children are all dead. Enraged, Robin asks Humpty if he killed the children. Humpty says he is innocent, and explains that he found them “near the river” as they floated up to him. Sad the children had died so close to Christmas, Humpty had tried to give them one last holiday.

In The New 52 reboot of DC's continuity, Humpty Dumpty is first seen as an inmate at Arkham Asylum at the same time that Resurrection Man is incarcerated there.

In other media
 Humpty Dumpty appears in Beware the Batman, voiced by Matt Jones. This version is a former mob accountant under Tobias Whale, who he was meant to testify against before going insane following an attempt on his life carried out by the crime boss' men.
 A biography for Humpty Dumpty appears in Batman: Arkham Asylum.

See also
 List of Batman family enemies

References

Characters created by Dan Slott
Comics characters introduced in 2003
DC Comics male supervillains
Fictional mechanics